Harbonnières is a commune in the Somme department in Hauts-de-France in northern France.

Geography

Population

Places of interest
 Saint Martin's church at Harbonnières. A large 15th-century building with a tower topped by a dome. A sundial is visible on the façade.
 Heath Cemetery, a World War I cemetery operated by the Commonwealth War Graves Commission.

See also
Communes of the Somme department

References

Communes of Somme (department)